Eurhodope cirrigerella is a species of snout moth in the genus Eurhodope. It was described by Johann Leopold Theodor Friedrich Zincken in 1818, and is known from most of Europe.

The wingspan is 19–22 mm.

The larvae feed on the flowers of Knautia and Scabiosa species.

References

Moths described in 1818
Phycitini
Moths of Europe